Edward Mitchell "Ted" Weggeland (born September 30, 1963) is an American lawyer, politician, and corporate executive from California.

Early life and education
Born in Rochester, New York, he earned his Bachelor of Arts in Political Science from the University of California, Los Angeles and his Juris Doctor from Pepperdine University School of Law.

Political career
He began his political career as a congressional aide to Al McCandless.

From 1992 to 1996, Weggeland served in the California State Assembly representing the 64th District and was a Republican. While in this position he served as Minority Whip and Chairman of the House Committee on Banking and Finance.

He later served on the California Fish & Game and Travel & Tourism Commissions.

Other activities
He served on the Bipartisan Commission on the Political Reform Act of 1972, co-chaired the 1999 Congressional Medal of Honor Society National Convention, and served on the board of trustees of the National D-Day Museum. He now serves the museum as corporate secretary and chairs its marketing committee.

From 1996 to 2012 he served as senior vice president of the Entrepreneurial Corporate Group.

He founded the Raincross Corporate Group in 2012, which comprises multiple companies (Raincross Development Company, Raincross Advisors, Inc., and the Raincross Hospitality Corporation).

In April 2019 he was appointed to the USA Water Polo board of directors.

He also initiated and chaired the effort to build the Riverside Aquatics Complex, and in 2012 he founded the Riverside Sports Commission.

Personal life
He and his wife Jennifer reside in Riverside, California with their two sons (Jack and Will).

References

External links
Join California Ted Weggeland

1963 births
Living people
People from Rochester, New York
Lawyers from Riverside, California
Pepperdine University School of Law alumni
California lawyers
Republican Party members of the California State Assembly
University of California, Los Angeles alumni
20th-century American politicians
20th-century American lawyers
People from Riverside, California